Mount Cox is a mountain  high in the north-central part of the Emlen Peaks,  north of Killer Nunatak, Victoria Land, Antarctica. The topographical feature was first mapped by the United States Geological Survey (USGS) from surveys and from U.S. Navy air photos, 1960–63, and named by the Advisory Committee on Antarctic Names for Allen N. Cox, U.S. Navy, crew chief in R4D (Skytrain) aircraft during 1962–63 in support of the USGS Topo East-West survey. Cox returned to the Antarctic in the 1963–64 and 1964–65 seasons. The mountain lies situated on the Pennell Coast, a portion of Antarctica lying between Cape Williams and Cape Adare.

References 

Mountains of Victoria Land
Pennell Coast